S. K. Singh may refer to:

 Shilendra Kumar Singh (1932–2009), an Indian diplomat
 S. K. Singh (general) (born 1954), an Indian Army officer

See also
K. S. Singh, Indian anthropologist